Hemlock Lake is one of the minor Finger Lakes.  It is mostly located in Livingston County, New York, south of Rochester, with a portion overlapping into Ontario County. Hemlock is a translation of the Seneca name for the lake, O-neh-da Te-car-ne-o-di.

Description
Because the lake is a water source to Rochester, shore development is restricted and boats can be no longer than 16 feet and outboard motors no larger than 10 horsepower. Swimming is not permitted in the lake.

A feature of the lake is its land-locked salmon.  In addition, the lake contains rainbow trout, brown trout, lake trout, smallmouth bass, largemouth bass, rock bass, chain pickerel, brown bullhead, yellow perch, walleye, and black crappie.

History
The Seneca people used the lake and its surrounding area for hunting and fishing near the south end of the lake up until the late 1770s. In September 1779 General John Sullivan and his army drove the natives away from the lake as part of the Sullivan Expedition.

In the 1790s Hemlock Lake received its first white settlers. Most of these settlers were involved in the lumber industry and built their homes out of wooden slabs by the outlet which is located at the north end of the lake. For a time this place was known as "Slab City". The lake was used to float logs to Slab City in the summer months as well as to haul logs on the ice in the winter time.

Over the years Hemlock Lake became populated with over one hundred cottages and five hotels. There were five large boats that sailed the lake in the 1800s, including its first steam boat "The Seth Green". The lake was a popular summer vacation destination for the wealthy, many of whom came from Rochester.

In 1852 the City of Rochester approved the construction of a  pipeline after a severe outbreak of illness caused by contaminated city water. In 1876 the gravity-fed pipeline connecting Hemlock Lake to Rochester was opened. To improve water quality, the city purchased the land surrounding both Hemlock Lake and neighboring Canadice Lake; the lakes' cottages, hotels, and farms were condemned and torn down beginning in 1895. Property owners who refused to sell to the city became the subject of eminent domain.

In 2010 the New York State Department of Environmental Conservation (DEC) purchased both Hemlock and Canadice Lakes from the City of Rochester for $13.7 million. The State has pledged to keep the lakes forever wild.

See also

References

The Democrat and Chronicle Sunday Magazine, November 21, 1993
The Democrat and Chronicle Sunday Magazine, August 8, 2010

External links
 Hemlock Water Filtration, City of Rochester Water Supply System

Finger Lakes
Protected areas of Ontario County, New York
Protected areas of Livingston County, New York
Lakes of New York (state)
Lakes of Ontario County, New York
Lakes of Livingston County, New York